Kenneth Daniel Taylor (born September 2, 1963) is a former professional American football defensive back who played cornerback for two seasons for the Chicago Bears and the San Diego Chargers of the National Football League.  He was a member of the Bears team that won Super Bowl XX following the 1985 NFL season.

1985 Bears
As a member of the 1985 Chicago Bears defense, he intercepted three passes during the 1985 regular season. His first NFL interception came in Week 4 against Washington and he picked off another pass in Week 8 at Soldier Field against the Minnesota Vikings.

Taylor made one start for the 1985 Bears defense, filling in for an injured Mike Richardson in Week 9 against the Green Bay Packers. He made 2 tackles in the game, his only start for Chicago.

Taylors main contribution in 1985 came as a Punt Returner. He returned 25 punts for 198 yards with a 7.9 yard average. He also returned 1 kick for 18 yards.

1963 births
Living people
Players of American football from San Jose, California
American football cornerbacks
Oregon State Beavers football players
Chicago Bears players
San Diego Chargers players

poo